Betty Reid Soskin ( Charbonnet; born September 22, 1921) is an American retired ranger with the National Park Service, previously assigned to the Rosie the Riveter World War II Home Front National Historical Park in Richmond, California. Until her retirement on March 31, 2022, at age 100, she was the oldest National Park Ranger serving the United States. In February 2018, she released a memoir, Sign My Name to Freedom.

Early life  

Betty Charbonnet was born in 1921 in Detroit to Dorson Louis Charbonnet and Lottie Breaux Allen, both Catholics and natives of Louisiana. Her father came from a Creole background, and her mother from a Cajun background. Her great-grandmother had been born into slavery in 1846. She spent her early childhood living in New Orleans, until a hurricane and flood destroyed her family's home and business in 1927, when her family then relocated to Oakland, California.

Soskin graduated from Castlemont High School in Oakland.

During World War II she worked as a file clerk for Boilermakers Union A-36, an all-black union auxiliary. Her main job was filing change of address cards for the workers, who moved frequently.

In June 1945, she and her then husband, Mel Reid, founded Reid's Records in Berkeley, California, a small black-owned business specializing in Gospel music. They moved to Walnut Creek, California in the 1950s, where their children attended better public schools and an alternative private elementary and middle school called Pinel. The family encountered considerable racism, and she and her husband were subject to death threats after they built a home in the white suburb.

Career 

She converted to Unitarianism and became active in the Mount Diablo Unitarian Universalist Church and the Black Caucus of the Unitarian Universalist Association, and in the 1960s became a well-known songwriter in the Civil Rights Movement.

She was divorced from Mel Reid in 1972, and subsequently married William Soskin, a psychology professor at the University of California, Berkeley. In 1978, after Mel Reid's health and finances had declined, she took over management of the music store, which led to her becoming active in area civic matters and a prominent community activist. Reid's Records closed on October 19, 2019. 

She later served as a field representative for California State Assemblywomen Dion Aroner and Loni Hancock, and in those positions became actively involved in the early planning stages and development of a park to memorialize the role of women on the Home Front during World War II. Those efforts came to fruition when Rosie the Riveter/World War II Home Front National Historical Park was established in 2000, to provide a site where future generations could remember the contributions women made to the war effort.

Reflecting on her own role in planning for the park's creation, and on how she brought her personal recollections of the conditions for African American women working in that still segregated environment to bear on the planning efforts, she has said that, often, she "was the only person in the room who had any reason to remember that … what gets remembered is a function of who's in the room doing the remembering."

In 2003, she left her state job and became a consultant at the park she helped create before becoming a park ranger with the National Park Service in 2007 at the age of 85.

Soskin's duties included conducting park tours and serving as an interpreter, explaining the park's purpose, history, various sites, and museum collections to park visitors. She has been celebrated as "a tireless voice for making sure the African-American wartime experienceboth the positive steps toward integration and the presence of discriminationhas a prominent place in the Park's history."

Soskin said in 2015 at the age of 93, "Wish I'd had [the] confidence when the young Betty needed it to navigate through the hazards of everyday life on the planet. But maybe I'm better able to benefit from having it nowwhen I have the maturity to value it and the audacity to wield it for those things held dear."

Soskin suffered a stroke while working at the park in September 2019 and returned to work in a limited, informal capacity in January 2020.

In celebration of her 100th birthday the West Contra Costa Unified School District renamed Juan Crespi Middle School to Betty Reid Soskin Middle School.

On March 31, 2022, Soskin retired from the National Park Service; she was the oldest serving park ranger at the time.

Honors 

 California Woman of the Year, California Legislature, 1995
 Builders of Communities and Dreams, National Women's History Project, 2006
 Cited in "Wherever there's a fightthe history of the ACLU in California" – Elaine Elinson and Stan Yogi, 2007
 Attended President Obama's Inauguration as a guest of Rep. George Miller, 2009
 Proclamation honoring her by Richmond Mayor Gayle McLaughlin on behalf of Richmond City Council, 2009
 Received honorary doctorate at California College of the Arts at Spring Commencement, 2010
 Received the WAVE award as one of three "Women of Achievement" by GirlSource of San Francisco, 2010
 Received a commemorative presidential coin in 2015; it was stolen from her in a home robbery in 2016, but later in 2016 she received a new one
 The National WWII Museum Silver Service Medallion, at the American Spirit Awards gala, 2016
 Recognition in the Congressional Record in 2016.
 Received honorary doctorate of arts and letters at Mills College, 2017
 Received the Robin W. Winks Award for Enhancing Public Understanding of National Parks from the  National Parks Conservation Association, 2018
 Recognition in the Congressional Record in 2019
 Juan Crespi Middle School in the West Contra Costa Unified School District was renamed Betty Reid Soskin Middle School to honor Soskin; the renaming ceremony was held on her hundredth birthday on September 22, 2021

References

Sources 
 Rachel Gillett – "Meet the 93-Year-Old Woman Who Still Works 5 Days a Week and Never Wants to Retire: Betty Reid Soskin is the oldest active ranger in the National Park Service", AOL Jobs, July 28, 2015. Retrieved 2015-08-09

External links 
 Personal blog
 Betty Reid Soskin: Rosie the Riveter World War II American Homefront Oral History Project
 Reid's Records
Official website for Soskin's memoir

1921 births
Activists from the San Francisco Bay Area
African-American activists
African-American centenarians
African-American history in the San Francisco Bay Area
American centenarians
American Unitarian Universalists
American community activists
Living people
National Park Service personnel
People from Berkeley, California
People from Oakland, California
People from Richmond, California
Women centenarians
21st-century African-American people
20th-century African-American people